Vedapureeswarar Temple in Puducherry, in the South Indian union territory of Puducherry, is dedicated to the Hindu god Shiva. Constructed in the Dravidian style of architecture, the temple was demolished by the French troops in 1748. Shiva is worshipped as Vedapureeswarar and his consort Parvathi as Tiripurasundari.

A granite wall surrounds the temple, enclosing all its shrines. The temple has a five-tiered rajagopuram, the gateway tower. A Dewan named Dewan Kandappa Mudaliar expanded the temple with the help of public contributions in 1788.

The temple is open from 6 am - 12:30 pm and 4:30 - 8:00 pm on all days. Four daily rituals and many yearly festivals are held at the temple, of which the Brahmotsavam festival during the Tamil month of Vaikasi (May - June), Annabishekam during Aipassi (October - November) and Sivarathri during Masi (February - March) being the most prominent. The temple is maintained and administered by the Department of Hindu religious institutions and Wakf of the Government of Puducherry.

History

Puducherry or Pondicherry was originally called Podouke(This was mentioned in the Periplus of the Erythraean Sea.). This old port town Podouke( Now it is called Arikamedu) is 4 km from the present Puducherry.  As per investigation by Vimala Begley, this port city Podouke was at the peak between from the 2nd century BCE to the 8th century CE. This port city enjoyed extensive trade relations with Imperial Rome. François Martin the first Governor General of French India founded the modern Pondicherry, the future capital of French India in 1674. The Varadaraja temple housed the images of the Vedapureeswarar Temple during the destruction by the French troops during 1748. It is believed that the temple was totally destructed by the invading French troops and earlier by Muslim invaders. Dewan Kandappa Mudaliar, with the help of public contributions, reconstructed the temple in 1788. The details of the demolition has been recorded in the diary of a chronicler of a period named Ananda Rangam Pillai. The presiding deity in the temple is believed to have been migrated from the Samba Easwaran street to the temple during the later part of the 19th century. The temple is maintained and administered by Sri Vedapureeswarar Sri Varadaraja Perumal Devastanam under the Department of Hindu religious institutions and Wakf of the Government of Puducherry.

Architecture
The presiding deity Vedapureeswarar, in the form of Lingam is housed in the sanctum. The sanctum is approached from the main entrance through the flag staff hall, Maha mandap and Artha mandap. The flag staff is located in the flagstaff hall axial to the sanctum. An image of Nandi faces the main shrine in the Maha Mandap. There are shrines of Vinayaga and Muruga before the Mahamandap and the sanctum is guarded by Dwarapalas. The shrine of Tiripurasundari is located in the second precinct. There also shrines of Shani, Durga, Chandikeswara, Dakshninamurthy and Navagraha around the sanctum. The rectangular temple tank is located inside the temple and has 35 steps to the basement

Festival

The temple follows Saivite tradition. The temple priests perform the pooja (rituals) during festivals and on a daily basis. The temple rituals are performed four times a day: Kalasanthi at 8:30 a.m., Uchikalam at 12:30 p.m., Sayarakshai at 6:00 p.m., and Arthajamam between 8:30  - 9:00 p.m. Each ritual has three steps: alangaram (decoration), neivethanam (food offering) and deepa aradanai (waving of lamps) for both Vedapureeswarar and Tiripurasundari. There are weekly, monthly and fortnightly rituals performed in the temple. The temple is open from 6 am - 12:30 pm and 4-9:00 pm on all days. The temple has many festivals in its calendar, with the Brahmotsavam festival during the Tamil month of Vaikasi (May - June), Annabishekam during Aipassi (October - November) and Sivarathri during Masi (February - March) being the most prominent. Saint Ramalinga Swamigal (1823–74) has sung praises about the Murugan in the temple.

References

External links

Shiva temples in Puducherry